Deaffest is the UK's only deaf-led film and television festival that celebrates the talents of deaf filmmakers and media artists from all over the world. Hosted by Light House Media Centre in Wolverhampton, Deaffest provides access to both deaf and hearing audiences with all festival goers being able to experience screenings, workshops, panel discussions, and performances.

History
Since 1998, Wolverhampton's Light House has hosted the annual Deaf Film and TV Festival. Originally a collaboration with the British Deaf Association, the festival took a hiatus in 2005 but was later re-launched in 2006 as Deaffest. Deaffest 2010 was the twelfth festival to be held in Wolverhampton since 1998.
The festival is managed by a steering group including representatives from Zebra Uno, Light House and University of Wolverhampton.

Deaffest 2010
Deaffest 2010 took place on 21–23 May.

The award winners for Deaffest 2010 were:

 Best In Festival:
Departure Lounge - Louis Neethling

 Ben Steiner Bursary:
Stephen Collins - His pitch for the film Luke Starr

Deaffest 2010 was made up of the following...
A selection of short films from Encounters International Film Festival specially subtitled for Deaffest 2010.
An insight into the BSLBT and a screening of some of the short films they have screened.
International Deaf films from Hong Kong, Norway, Singapore, Bulgaria, Australia, Finland and France.
Pitching sessions from the hopefuls for this year’s Ben Steiner Bursary and a chance to see the winning film from last year’s Bursary, Dead Money by Bim Ajadi.
Award for the Best in Festival presented on the Saturday night of the festival.
Face painting and balloon fun for families and an information fair from local and national organisations.
A free subtitled screening of Tim Burton’s Alice in Wonderland.

Deaffest 2009
The award winners for Deaffest 2009 were:

 Best TV Programme:
Wicked Series 2 Prog 1 - Ramon Woolfe, UK, 2009

 Best Experimental Film:
The Deaf Man - Dir. DJ Kurs, USA, 2007

 Best Factual Film:
See Hear: The Deaf Brain - 2009

 8 Best Drama:
Stiletto - Dir. William Mager, UK, 2008

References

External links
 Deaffest’ website
 Deaffest’s photo stream
 Light House Media Centre's website
 Deaffest 2009

Film festivals in England
Deaf culture in the United Kingdom